Südliche Petermann Range ( also known as Söre Petermannkjeda, and Gory Otto Grotevolya) is one of the Petermann Ranges, trending NE-SW for  from Svarthausane Crags to Gneiskopf Peak, in the Wohlthat Mountains, Queen Maud Land. Mount Neustruyev (also known as Gora Neustruyeva) is a 2,900 meter peak standing  NNE of Gneiskopf Peak.

Discovery and naming 
Südliche Petermann Range was discovered and plotted from air photos by the Third German Antarctic Expedition (1938-1939), led by Capt. Alfred Ritscher, which gave directional names to the eastern, middle and western units of the Petermann Ranges. This range was named Sore Petermannkjeda by Sixth Norwegian Antarctic Expedition, 1956–60, because of its southern position in association with other units in the Petermann Ranges. A German form of this name has been recommended by US-ACAN to agree with spellings adopted for the aforementioned ranges.

Features

 Aurdalsegga Ridge
 Bystrov Rock
 Gneiskopf Peak
 Isdalen Valley
 Isdalsegga Ridge
 Krasheninnikov Peak
 Mount Kolodkin
 Mount Mirotvortsev
 Mount Neustruyev
 Zhil'naya Mountain

See also 
 List of mountains of Queen Maud Land

References

Mountain ranges of Queen Maud Land
Princess Astrid Coast